Michaela Eßl (born 27 October 1988) is an Austrian ski mountaineer. She has been member of the ASKIMO national team since 2008. Professionally she works as a police officer in Abtenau.

Selected results 
 2008:
 1st, Knappen-Königs-Trophy
 1st, Preberlauf,
 1st, Dachstein-Xtreme,
 1st, Monte di Brenta,
 3rd, Mountain Attack
 2009:
 1st, Austrian Championship
 9th, European Championship single race
 9th, European Championship vertical race
 2010:
 3rd, World Championship relay race (together with Lydia Prugger and Veronika Swidrak)
 5th, World Championship team race (together with Lydia Prugger)
 1st, World Championship single race (espoirs class)
 3rd, World Championship vertical race (espoirs class)
 10th, World Championship combination ranking
 1st, Mountain Attack
 2011:
 6th, World Championship relay (together with Lydia Prugger and Veronika Swidrak)
 2012:
 4th, European Championship sprint
 5th, European Championship relay, together with Ina Forchthammer and Veronika Swidrak
 6th, European Championship single
 7th, World Championship vertical, combined ranking
 8th, European Championship vertical race
 1st, Mountain Attack

Patrouille des Glaciers 

 2010: 4th (and 3rd in the "international civilian women" ranking), together with Veronika Swidrak and Lydia Prugger

External links 
 Michaela Eßl at www.hagan-ski.com
 Michaela Essl , ASKIMO

References 

1988 births
Living people
Austrian female ski mountaineers
Austrian police officers
21st-century Austrian women